Guldsmeden Hotels is a family-owned, Green Globe-certified chain of upscale boutique hotels based out of Copenhagen, Denmark. It consists of six hotels in Denmark (five in Copenhagen and one in Aarhus) and one hotel in Oslo (Norway), Reykjavík (Iceland), Berlin (Germany), Menton (France) and Bali (Indonesia).

The chain is owned by Sandra and Marc Plesner Weinert and takes its name after the street Guldsmedegade in Aarhus where they opened their first hotel in 1999.

Sustainability
All hotels in the Guldsmeden Hotels chain have been awarded the Green Globe and Golden Ø eco labels.

Hotels in Denmark

Hotel 66 Guldsmeden
Hotel 66 Guldsmeden /formerly Hotel Carlton) has 74 rooms and is located at Vesterbrogade 66 in Vesterbro, Copenhagen. It was Guldsmeden Hotels' first hotel in Copenhagen when it opened in 2002 and has been through several renovations and expansions since then.

Hotel Bertram 
Hotel Bertram has 47 rooms and is located at Vesterbrogade 107 in Vesterbro, Copenhagen. It opened in 2005.

Hotel Axel Guldsmeden
Hotel Axel has 202 rooms (including four penthouse suites with their own private rooftop terrace) and is located at Colbjørnsensgade 14 in Vesterbro, Copenhagen. The hotel was located in Helgolandsgade on the other side of the block when it opened in 2007 but it was expanded with the former Hotel du Nord in  Colbjørnsensgade  in 2017. Facilities include a spa area and a courtyard garden.

Hotel Babette Guldsmeden
Hotel Babette Guldsmeden has 98 rooms and is located at the corner of Bredgade (No. 78) and Esplanaden in the Frederiksstaden district of central Copenhagen. Facilities include restaurant & bar Bar’bette and an orangery which connects the two parts of the hotel.

The hotel was formerly operated by Girst Hotels as Hotel Esplanaden. It was taken over by Guldsmeden Hotels in 2014 and reopened after a major renovation on 20 February 2015. The building is from 1883 and was designed by Emil Blichfeldt.

Hotel Manon les Suites
Hotel Manon les Suites has 87 rooms and suites and is located at Gyldenløvesgade 10 in central Copenhagen. The hotel was formerly operated by Girst Hotels but taken over by Guldsmeden Hotels on 1 October 2016 and reopened after a major renovation in April 2017. Facilities include an indoor swimming pool.

Hotels outside Denmark

Hotel Oslo Guldsmeden
Hotel Guldsmeden oslo is located at Parkveien 78 in Oslo, Norway. It joined Guldsmeden Hotels in 2010.

Hotel Eyja Guldsmeden (Reykjavík)
Hotel Eyja Guldsmeden in Reykiavik opened in 2015 and has 65 rooms.

Lulu Guldsmeden Hotel(Berlin)
Lulu Guldsmeden Hotel, opened in September 2016, is located on Potsdamer Strasse in Berlin, Germany. It has 81 rooms, six suites, and facilities include a meeting room for 12 people.

Chapung Se Bali Resort & Spa (Ubud, Bali - Indonesia)
Chapung Se Bali Resort & Spa opened in 2010. It has 14 Suites and 8 Villas.

Future hotel openings
In November 2017, it was announced that Guldsmeden Hotels will open their sixth hotel in Copenhagen at the corner of Gullfossgade and Artillerivej om Islands Brygge in 2019. The hotel will have 214 rooms and 50 work stations. The building is owned by PFA Ejendomme.

Awards
Guldsmeden Hotels won the award for Best Hotel Chain at the Danish Travel Awards in 2017 and was runner-up in 2016.

References

Hospitality companies of Denmark
Hotel and leisure companies based in Copenhagen
Hotel chains in Denmark
Danish companies established in 1999
Hotels established in 1999